Parabomis is a genus of spiders in the family Thomisidae. It was first described in 1901 by Władysław Kulczyński.

Species 
 it contains six species, found only in Africa:

 Parabomis elsae Dippenaar-Schoeman & Foord, 2020 – South Africa
 Parabomis levanderi Kulczyński, 1901 – Eritrea
 Parabomis martini Lessert, 1919 – Guinea, Kenya, Rwanda, Tanzania, Zambia, Malawi, Namibia, Zimbabwe, South Africa
 Parabomis megae Dippenaar-Schoeman & Foord, 2020 – Zimbabwe
 Parabomis pilosa Dippenaar-Schoeman & Foord, 2020 – Botswana, South Africa
 Parabomis wandae Dippenaar-Schoeman & Foord, 2020 – Ivory Coast, Ghana, Rwanda, Kenya

References

Thomisidae
Araneomorphae genera
Spiders of Africa